La fuerza del destino (English title: The Power of Destiny) is an original Mexican telenovela produced by Rosy Ocampo for Televisa, and aired on Canal de las Estrellas from March 14, 2011 to July 31, 2011. In the United States the telenovela aired on Univision from August 2, 2011 to December 26, 2011.

David Zepeda, Sandra Echeverría and Gabriel Soto star as the main protagonists, while Laisha Wilkins, Rosa María Bianchi, Ferdinando Valencia and Juan Ferrara star as the main antagonists. With stellar performance of Delia Casanova, Leticia Calderón and Pedro Armendáriz Jr., who died a few months after finishing his work in this story.

Plot 
14 year old Iván (Adriano Zendejas) returns with his mother, Alicia (Leticia Calderón), to Álamos, Sonora, his birthplace. His father, Juan Jaime Mondragon (Juan Ferrara), a wealthy and powerful businessman and landowner, does not recognize him as his son and rejects him. Alicia keeps her son's origin a secret and is forced to accept the job as a servant for the Lomelí Curiel family, where Doña Carlota (Delia Casanova), her daughter Lucrecia (Rosa María Bianchi), her son-in-law Gerardo (Alejandro Tommasi), and their two daughters, the teen Maripaz (Ilse Zamarripa) and Lucía (Renata Notni) live.

Years go by and Iván (David Zepeda) and Maripaz (Laisha Wilkins) are now adolescents. Iván Feels attraction to Maripaz and she, for being frivolous and shallow, seduces him and ends up pregnant. Her family is faced with keeping the pregnancy a secret to keep their family's good name. Iván visits his godmother, Arcelia, and there finds his mother dying after trying to end her own pregnancy, much to his surprise. He believes Juan Jaime is the father of the baby.

When Iván walks outside to get some air, he is attacked by Lucrecia's thugs for getting Maripaz pregnant. During the brawl, Iván's friends, Camilo and his brother Antolín, arrive and rush to help him. Antolín stabs one of the men, killing him. However, Iván is mistakenly accused of the murder and flees the country out of fear of being unjustly convicted for murder and sent to prison. He crossing the border illegally, still recovering from the beating and fighting the natural elements of the desert between Mexico and the United States. He goes to Los Angeles, California and ends up staying there for eleven years, eventually becoming a successful engineer. There, he meets Anthony McGuire (Pedro Armendáriz Jr.), an elder businessman who has lost his wife and only son. Anthony initially pays for Iván's education and then arranges to adopt him. Anthony encourages Iván to return to Mexico with him, not only for business but also to face his past.

Iván gets several pieces of surprising news when he returns to Sonora, among them is that the child he conceived with Maripaz mysteriously disappeared the same day he was born, and no one has known about him since then. He meets Lucía (Sandra Echeverría), now a young child psychologist, who confesses to Iván that she has secretly loved him since she was a child. Lucía promises to help him find his son, regain his dignity, and overcome all the obstacles with courage. Iván discovers that Alex, the adopted son of Gerardo, is his son. Maripaz also discovered the fact and told Iván that if he didn't marry her, she would take Alex away from him. Thinking about his son, Iván agreed to marry Maripaz and end his relationship with Lucía, whom he is in love with. Iván marries Maripaz and moves to United States with her, Alex, and his father.

After Lucia and Ivan break up, Lucia goes to a club with a friend in an attempt to cheer herself up. She drinks a beer at the bar and her drink contained a date rape drug, which leads her to being raped without knowing. Weeks later, Lucía discovers that she's pregnant, and believes that Iván is the real father as they had sex before he got married and left. Carlota suggests that Lucía should marry Camilo, who deeply loves her, as she don't want her granddaughter to be a single mother. Lucía gives birth to baby girl named Perlita, and marries Camilo. Lucía is unable to forget about her relationship with Iván, which makes Camilo feel angry and jealous. After Maripaz committed adultery, Iván divorces her and gains parental rights for Alex. Anthony later tells Iván that Lucía married Camilo and have a baby, which makes him feel angry and betrayed. He returns to Álamos to seek for reasons as to why it happened.

Iván's return causes jealousy in Camilo, causing Lucía to start thinking twice about staying married to Camilo. Meanwhile, Maripaz returns and now turns her attention to seducing Camilo, starts an affair with him. Lucía continues with the divorce proceedings, and during the court process, Perlita's custody meets challenges after DNA results prove she is not the daughter of Iván. Lucía begins to recall actions on the night of Perla's conception, revealing that she was actually raped. After undergoing hypnosis therapy, Lucía finally gets to recall the face of her attacker as Saúl (Ferdinando Valencia), Juan Jaime's son.

Lucía and Iván decide against filing a case against Saúl so as not to taint the future of Perlita. Lucrecia is found to have a kidney failure and she will need continuous treatment and eventually a transplant to save her life. Camilo breaks off his relationship with Maripaz in light of Maripaz becoming needy and meddling. Later, it is found out that Maripaz is the only one compatible to her mother. Maripaz agrees to donate a kidney and during the operation she dies, saving her mother's life and is recognized by Alex as a hero.

After an audit is done on the Agricultural Association's accounts, Juan Jaime is forced by the association to pay back money he stole in exchange of non-involvement of the authorities; However, his wife, Esther (Lucero Lander), is also filing for a divorce with a request of half the share of the Mondragón wealth. These activities causes Juan Jaime to get deeper into his tequila bottle, and eventually he is left alone with no one at his side. Saúl, who is on the run, is arranging with his partner, "El Gordo", on kidnapping Iván's son for money. When arranging to receive ransom from Iván in a desolate area, "El Gordo" shoots Iván, who is then gets shot by Camilo. "El Gordo" and Saúl's other accomplice, shoots Camilo in the process and leaves all three of them there and runs with the bag of money. After a long battle with infection, both Camilo and Iván recover and they are finally reunited with their families.

In the end, Saúl imprisoned and commits suicide in his prison cell, and Iván and Lucía finally get married while Camilo meets a woman at their wedding.

Cast

Main
David Zepeda as Iván Villagómez / Iván McGuire
Sandra Echeverría as Lucía Lomelí Curiel 
Gabriel Soto as Camilo Galván
Laisha Wilkins as Maripaz Lomelí Curiel
Juan Ferrara as Juan Jaime Mondragón
Alejandro Tommasi as Gerardo Lomelí

Also main

Pedro Armendáriz Jr. as Anthony McGuire 
Delia Casanova as Carlota Curiel
Rosa María Bianchi as Lucrecia Curiel de Lomelí
Leticia Perdigón as Arcelia Galván
Kika Edgar as Carolina Muñoz
Marcelo Córdoba as Antolín Galván 
Ferdinando Valencia as Saúl Mondragón
Lucero Lander as Esther Mondragón
Yuliana Peniche as Carmen Galván
Jaume Mateu as David Mondragón
Roxana Rojo de la Vega as Judith Mondragón 
Rosángela Balbó as Olga de los Santos
Alfonso Iturralde as Silvestre Galván 
Leticia Calderón as Alicia Villagómez

Recurring

Ignacio Guadalupe as Benito Jiménez 
Willebaldo López as Cleto 
María Prado as Gloria 
Joana Brito as Eduviges
Fernando Robles as Leandro
José Montini as Miguel Hernández "El Gordo"
Diego Velázquez as Alejandro "Álex" Lomelí Muñoz
Evelyn Zavala as Alicia "Licha" Mondragón Galván
Renée Varsi as Juliette Abascal de Rodríguez 
Ramón Valdez as Ezequiel
Carla Cardona as Berenice Escalante
Luis Bayardo as Juez Porfirio
Jesús Moré as Ing. Carlos Orozco 
Rubén Cerda as Dr. Fuentes
Moisés Manzano as El Compadre

Guest stars

Roberto Sen as Lic. Castaño
José María Negri as Lic. Torres
Beatriz Moreno as Stella
Alejandro Peraza as Dr. Cuéllar
Agustín Arana as Robert "Bob" Rodríguez
Adriano Zendejas as Iván Villagómez (young)
Renata Notni as Lucía Lomelí Curiel (teenager)
Marilyz León as Lucía Lomelí Curiel (young)
Ilse Zamarripa as María de la Paz "Maripaz" Lomelí Curiel (young)
Michael Ronda as Camilo Galván (young)
Erick Díaz as Antolín Galván (young)
Alejandro de Hoyos Parera as Saúl Mondragón Domínguez (young)
Fernanda Urdapilleta as Judith Mondragón Domínguez  (young)
Pablo Valentín as Abogado Lara

Reception 
The final episode achieved the rating of 22.6. In the United States the final episode aired on December 26, 2011, and was watched by 6.2 million viewers, becoming the most watched program, regardless of language.

Awards and nominations

References

External links

Spanish-language telenovelas
2011 telenovelas
2011 Mexican television series debuts
2011 Mexican television series endings
Mexican telenovelas
Televisa telenovelas